Thomas Michael O'Neil (born September 2, 1940 in Hibbing, Minnesota) is an American physicist who specializes in plasma physics.

Early life and career 
O’Neil obtained his bachelor's degree at California State University, Long Beach in 1962, and then his master's degree and Ph.D. at the University of California, San Diego (UCSD) in 1964 and 1965 respectively. From 1965 to 1967, he was a scientist at General Atomics and from 1967 at UCSD as an assistant professor and later a professor. From 1980 to 1984, he was on the advisory board of the Institute of Fusion Studies at the University of Texas at Austin.

Honors and awards 
O'Neil is a fellow of the American Physical Society. In 1971, O'Neil was awarded the Sloan Research Fellowship by the Alfred P. Sloan Foundation. From 1979 to 1983, he was co-editor of the Physical Review Letters. In 1991, he received the John Dawson Award for Excellence in Plasma Physics Research with John Malmberg and Charles Driscoll for their studies of non-neutral plasmas.

In 1996, he received the James Clerk Maxwell Prize for Plasma Physics for "seminal contributions to plasma theory, including extension of Landau damping to the nonlinear regime and demonstration of the importance of particle trapping; discovery of the plasma-wave echo; and pioneering studies of the confinement, transport, and thermal equilibria of non-neutral plasmas, liquids and crystals. His theoretical work and active guidance of experiments with trapped, non-neutral plasmas provide much of the foundation for this branch of plasma physics".

References 

1940 births
Living people
People from Hibbing, Minnesota
American physicists
American plasma physicists
Fellows of the American Physical Society
Sloan Research Fellows
University of California, San Diego alumni
California State University, Long Beach alumni
Scientists from Minnesota